Silence in the Forest (German:Das Schweigen im Walde) may refer to:

 Silence in the Forest (novel), an 1899 novel written Ludwig Ganghofer
 Silence in the Forest (1929 film), a German silent film
 Silence in the Forest (1937 film), a German film
 Silence in the Forest (1955 film), a West German film
 Silence in the Forest (1976 film), a West German film